The Darlington's Bridge at Delaware Station was a highway bridge over the Delaware River in the community of Delaware, New Jersey (known locally as Delaware Station). Formerly a railroad bridge constructed by the Delaware, Lackawanna and Western Railroad in 1871 to replace an earlier 1855 timber span, the bridge was sold off when the new one upstream was constructed. Henry V. Darlington, an Episcopal minister in Delaware and nearby Belvidere offered to buy the second-hand bridge for $5,000 (1914 USD, equal to $ today). Darlington converted it into a highway bridge, using two fired members of the nearby Meyer's Ferry to be toll collectors. The bridge prospered, becoming a part of State Highway Route 6 in 1927 and U.S. Route 46 in 1936. In 1932, during the massive state takeover of bridges by the Delaware River Joint Toll Bridge Commission, Darlington refused offers, bargaining his way up to $275,000 (1932 USD, equal to $ today) before accepting the sale. This amount was a far cry from the nearby Belvidere-Riverton and Portland-Columbia Covered Bridge, which were accepted for $60,000 (equal to $ today) and $50,000 (equal to $ today) respectively. On that moment, tolls along the bridge and Route 6 were eliminated. The bridge prospered toll-free for another 21 years, until the construction of the Portland-Columbia Toll Bridge upstream at Columbia. Darlington was still alive to see all this transpire. The Commission ceased operations on the Darlington Bridge on April 3, 1954, and the bridge was immediately demolished.

History

Railroad bridge 
As expansion of the Delaware, Lackawanna and Western Railroad (DL&W) continued westward from Hoboken, the railroad company saw the need to build a new bridge over the Delaware River. Reaching the community of Delaware (named after the river nearby), DL&W built a train station previously in the community, denoted as Delaware Station. The new wood bridge was constructed on the railroad mainline during 1855. The new bridge had two tracks to cross the river, serving the local area with coal cars and boxcars crossing. The new bridge survived the floods in 1903 that destroyed many bridges (including the nearby Riverton-Belvidere Bridge) along the Delaware and continued to prosper.

However, as trains, cars and locomotives began to get heavier and larger, the DL&W needed to build a new bridge across the river to support the heavier weights. In 1902, they built the new bridge just upstream for the reason that it would not have to move much track for better service. As soon as the new bridge was finished, DL&W put the former one up for sale. Demand for second-hand bridges were not high at the time, and when Henry V.B. Darlington, a local Episcopal minister, put up an offer of $5,000 (1902 USD) for the bridge, DL&W immediately took the money. The railroad did not check on the background of Reverend Darlington or asked what he wanted to do with the iron structure. His money was "as good as anybody's", according to DL&W.

Henry Darlington's ownership 

After Darlington bought the railroad bridge from the Delaware, Lackawanna and Western Railroad he took out the tracks, replacing them with a paved roadway. Darlington knew the automobile was becoming a big entity in the 1910s and 1920s, turning the bridge into a vehicular bridge was an important decision to make the most out of the crossing. He also figured that the bridge would make a good approach for drivers coming to visit the local natural attractions, such as the Delaware Water Gap and the Pocono Mountains. Darlington created new roadway approaches (Lackawanna Road and Ferry Lane) to the bridge and even two buildings on the New Jersey side of the span. One building was for toll collecting while the other was for living quarters. These quarters were soon occupied by Edward McCracken and his wife. McCracken and his wife had come from the Meyer's Ferry, a local ferry service running at that point on the Delaware since the early 18th century. McCracken had been the local ferry operator, but when a large accident occurred during a dinner break killed four passengers, the owner put the ferry under his control and later fired McCracken. Klein later sold the ferry, which Darlington bought and shut down. He immediately hired the McCrackens to work as the toll collectors.

In the meantime, the only other bridge across the Delaware River easily accessible for vehicular use was the covered bridge in Columbia, New Jersey and Portland, Pennsylvania. Drivers heading along the local roads (later designated as State Highway Route 5), often came to Darlington's Bridge first. The McCrackens collected tolls in large bushel baskets, which were often filled to the brim of quarters and half-dollars. Locals said that the McCrackens were sometimes spotted dropping these coins off the bridge and into the river below, although swimmers were never able to find anything of value to support the myth. Even though the bridge made a large sum of a money and the tollhouse was often filled with money, the place was never robbed. Two Airedales the McCrackens kept in the tollhouse, named Duke and Totsey, helped keep the place clear from thieves.

In the time of the bridge prospering, Reverend Darlington was wed to Dorothy Stone Smith at the Trinity Chapel in Newark. The wedding, which occurred in November 1920, made the local news and the ceremony was performed by Darlington's father. Two years later, the Darlingtons made the news again, this time with the birth of their first child (a son) in Orange, New Jersey at Orange Memorial Hospital.

Buyout and dismantling 
The bridge continued to prosper through the 1920s and 1930s with a toll of one quarter to cross the bridge, with drivers of State Highway Route 6 coming along the bridge from the junction with State Highway Route 8 coming across the bridge since 1927. During the 1920s and 1930s, the states of New Jersey and Pennsylvania began to buy out bridges along the Delaware River under the Joint Commission for the Elimination of Toll Bridges. The reconstructed bridge at Belvidere was bought by the commission for $60,000 (1920s USD) and the covered bridge at Columbia for only $50,000. Although the commission tried to buy the second-hand railroad bridge for a lower, unspecified amount, Darlington refused, raising the amount to $275,000. Once the bridge was brought, tolls were eliminated.

Although the bridge remained in service for another 21 years as a free crossing, the Delaware River Joint Toll Bridge Commission constructed a brand new bridge at the Portland-Columbia. The new toll bridge was constructed in 1953 for $4 million (1953 USD, equal to $43,312,209.74 today), but the toll was only ten dollars (equal to $108.28 today), like the former price of the Darlington's Bridge. Darlington, who had retired from his job in Orange in 1950, was alive and was in disbelief. The next April, the Toll Bridge Commission went ahead and dismantled the Darlington's bridge, which was fought by several legal actions. The bridge ceased operations on April 3, 1954, being demolished soon after. The covered bridge at Columbia was destroyed during Hurricane Diane the next August. Just before the demolishing of Darlington's Bridge, the approach on the New Jersey side had been renumbered to State Highway Route 163, which remains in condition from when the bridge was in use.

See also 

List of crossings of the Delaware River

References

External links 
New Jersey Highway Ends - 163

Bridges over the Delaware River
Bridges in Monroe County, Pennsylvania
Road bridges in New Jersey
Railroad bridges in New Jersey
Road bridges in Pennsylvania
Railroad bridges in Pennsylvania
U.S. Route 46
Former toll bridges in New Jersey
Former toll bridges in Pennsylvania
Interstate vehicle bridges in the United States
Delaware River Joint Toll Bridge Commission
Delaware, Lackawanna and Western Railroad bridges